The Pittsburgh Thunderbirds are a professional ultimate team that competes in the Central Division of the American Ultimate Disc League. In July 2015, the Thunderbirds reached the playoffs in their first year of existence and beat the Chicago Wildfire before falling to the Madison Radicals in the divisional final. Standout player Tyler DeGirolamo, who set the AUDL season record with 89 assists in only 11 games played in 2015, was only able to play a few points against the Radicals before withdrawing with an injury.

2015 season 
The Pittsburgh Thunderbirds finished 2nd in the Midwest division with a 12–2 record, behind the Madison Radicals who finished 13–1. The Madison Radicals lone loss was to the Thunderbirds on May 2, 2015 at Founder's Field in Pittsburgh.

On June 12, 2015, the Thunderbirds were featured on ESPN3's game of the week against the Chicago Wildfire, dropping the contest 19–16 for their 2nd loss of the 2015 season.

2015 playoffs 
Due to scheduling conflicts, the Midwest playoffs had to be played on the same day, July 25, 2015. The #3 seed Chicago Wildfire met the #2 seeded Thunderbirds at a neutral site outside of Madison, Wisconsin at 4:00PM local time. In overtime, Max Thorne threw the go-ahead goal to Aaron Watson to secure the 24–23 victory.

3 hours later, the Thunderbirds went on to face the #1 seeded Madison Radicals at Breese Stevens Stadium in Madison, Wisconsin. The Thunderbirds would go on to lose the Midwest Championship, 24–21 after Tyler DeGirolamo exited the game with a recurring leg injury.

References

External links

Ultimate (sport) teams
Sports teams in Pittsburgh
2015 establishments in Pennsylvania
Ultimate teams established in 2015